Angelo is both a given name and a surname.

Angelo may also refer to:

Places

Brazil
 Santo Ângelo, a city

United States
 Angelo, Wisconsin, a town
 Angelo (community), Wisconsin, an unincorporated community
 San Angelo, Texas, a city

Arts, entertainment, and media
 Angelo (band), a Japanese rock band
 Angelo (opera), a 1876 opera by César Cui, based on Victor Hugo's play
 Angelo (poem), by Pushkin
 "Angelo" (song), a 1977 UK number one single by Brotherhood of Man
 "Angelo", 2005 winning song at Sanremo, by Francesco Renga
 Angelo, Tyrant of Padua, a 1835 play by Victor Hugo
 Avenging Angelo, a 2012 film
 Angelo (TV series), a 2017 Chinese television series

See also

 
 
 
 Angel (disambiguation)
 Angela (disambiguation)
 Angelov
 Angel (given name)
 Angeli (disambiguation)
 Sant'Angelo (disambiguation)
 Angelos (disambiguation)
 Anghel